Classics is a compilation album by Joey Beltram. It was released in 1996 by R&S Records.

Production and music
The album's tracks were initially recorded by Beltram when he was releasing material through R&S Records. '

Release
Classics was released in 1996 through R&S Records.

Reception

In a contemporary review, Select gave the album a four out of five rating, calling it "Lusher and more human than the ultra-minimal machine music he does now, these tracks from '90-'92 remain exemplary demonstrations of tension generated by restraint." The review noted that tracks like "Psychobase" anticipates tracks from The Chemical Brothers and ""Fuck You All MF" pre-dates the official investiture of jungle by years"

AllMusic gave the album a four and a half out of five star rating, noting that the album "leaves off some crucial cuts by dint of label affiliation, much of Beltram's most significant early work first appeared on R&S, making this CD/LP a perfect introduction to his influential sound."

Track listing
All track written, produced and performed by Joey Beltram except where noted

Credits
Credits adapted from Classics liner notes.
 Joey Beltram – writer, producer
 Mundo Muzique – writer, producer (tracks 9, 10)
 i-luv.mi.tdr – design 
 mcp04:tdr – photography

References

1996 compilation albums
Joey Beltram albums
R&S Records compilation albums